The fourth season of South Park, an American animated television series created by Trey Parker and Matt Stone, began airing on April 5, 2000. The fourth season concluded after airing 17 episodes on December 20, 2000.

The first four episodes in this season has the year 2000 at the end of their episode titles. As explained in the FAQ section on the official website: "When the year 2000 was coming up, everyone and their brother had '2000' in the titles of their products and TV shows. America was obsessed with 2000, so Trey Parker put '2000' in the titles to make fun of the ubiquity of the phrase."

This is the first season not to feature Mary Kay Bergman as a series regular, who provided many of the female voices on the show (Bergman committed suicide on November 11, 1999). It also marks the only whole season to be animated with their old software PowerAnimator before switching to Maya without her. Eliza Schneider and Mona Marshall replaced Mary Kay Bergman in season four after her death.

Voice cast

This is the first season to feature Eliza Schneider and Mona Marshall as series regulars, who would go on to provide many of the female voices on the show. They replaced Mary Kay Bergman, who died on November 11, 1999.

Main cast
 Trey Parker as Stan Marsh, Eric Cartman, Randy Marsh, Mr. Garrison, Clyde Donovan, Mr. Hankey, Mr. Mackey, Stephen Stotch, Jimmy Valmer, Timmy Burch and Phillip
 Matt Stone as Kyle Broflovski, Kenny McCormick, Butters Stotch, Gerald Broflovski, Stuart McCormick, Pip Pirrup, Craig Tucker, Jimbo Kern, Terrance and Jesus
 Eliza Schneider as Liane Cartman, Shelly Marsh, Sharon Marsh, Mayor McDaniels, Mrs. McCormick, Wendy Testaburger, Principal Victoria and Ms. Crabtree
 Mona Marshall as Sheila Broflovski and Linda Stotch
 Isaac Hayes as Chef

Guest cast
 Richard Belzer as Loogie ("The Tooth Fairy's Tats 2000")
 Cheech Marin as Carlos Ramirez ("Cherokee Hair Tampons") 
 Tommy Chong as Chief Running Pinto ("Cherokee Hair Tampons")
 Dian Bachar as Chris ("Do the Handicapped Go to Hell?" and "Probably")
 Malcolm McDowell as narrator ("Pip")
 Louis Price as Cornwallis's singing voice ("A Very Crappy Christmas")

Episodes

References

External links

 South Park Studios – official website with streaming video of full episodes.
 The Comedy Network – full episodes for Canada

 
2000 American television seasons